Français Glacier is a glacier  wide and  long, flowing north-northeast from the continental ice to the Antarctic coast close west of Ravin Bay. Though no glaciers were noted on Captain Jules Dumont d'Urville's chart of this coast, the close correlation of his "Baie des Ravins" feature and narrative description with the indentation of the coast near the mouth of this glacier suggests first sighting of this feature by the French Antarctic Expedition, 1837–40. During December 1912 members of the Main Base Party of the Australasian Antarctic Expedition (AAE) camped on the upland slopes close east of the glacier, but no reference was made to the glacier in the AAE reports, though a clear view and unpublished sketch were obtained of the distant coast to the northwest.

It was delineated from air photos taken by U.S. Navy Operation Highjump, 1946–47. The French Antarctic Expedition under Mario Marret, 1952–53, sledged west on the sea ice to the ice cliffs close east of the glacier. It was named after the Français, the expedition ship of the French Antarctic Expedition, 1903–05, under Dr. Jean-Baptiste Charcot.

See also
 List of glaciers in the Antarctic
 Glaciology

References

Glaciers of Adélie Land